Vauclair Castle, also Vauclerc Castle (French: 'Château Vauclair) was a castle built in La Rochelle, on the Atlantic coast of France, by Henry II of England in the 12th century.

The castle was located in the area defined by the current Place de Verdun (formally called Place du Château).

It was incorporated in the fortifications of the city built by William X of Aquitaine, father of Queen Eleanor of Aquitaine, in 1130.

The castle consisted of four large towers connected by high walls. It was demolished at the request of Charles V of France between 1372 and 1375, after the Siege of La Rochelle (1224), and its stones were used to build a new fortification wall at Le Gabut.

The name Vauclair comes from the Latin valde clarum (greatly light, luminous or white), as it was built in the white calcerous sandstone of the region.

Notes

References
Musée d'Orbigny Bernon

Ruined castles in Nouvelle-Aquitaine
Buildings and structures in La Rochelle